This is a list of mobile network operators of the Americas.

Anguilla

Antigua and Barbuda
The country has a 127% penetration rate.

Argentina
The country has a 147% penetration rate = 61.2m mobile subscribers (February 2014)

Aruba
The country's telecom regulator is the DTZ

Bahamas
The country has 0.318 million subscribers in total, or an 84% penetration rate. (September 2015)

Barbados
The country's telecom regulator is the Telecom Unit, under the Division of Energy and Telecommunications within the Prime Minister's Office.

Belize

Bermuda

Bolivia
The country has 10.2 million subscribers in total for a population of 10.56 million, or a 96.3% penetration rate. (December 2015)

The country's telecom regulator is ATT.

Bonaire

Brazil
The country has 252 million subscribers in total, or a 121.3% penetration rate. (Q4 2022)

Anatel regulates the country's telecommunications.

Technologies like AMPS, TDMA, iDEN and CDMA 1x/EV-DO were used in the past by some of those networks and have been phased out in favor of newer systems.

On 20 April 2022, Oi’s mobile network operations were sold to the country's three largest carriers, Vivo, Claro and TIM. Over the next twelve months, customers will be migrated to one of the other three carriers based on their area codes.

British Virgin Islands

Canada

The country's telecom regulator is the Canadian Radio-television and Telecommunications Commission (CRTC). However, it does not regulate most aspects of mobile phone service; prices and service quality are not regulated at all, while spectrum allocation is handled by Innovation, Science and Economic Development Canada.

There are numerous mobile virtual network operators, such as Virgin Mobile Canada. These are not presently listed due to difficulty retrieving data for all such operators, and uncertainty as to whether the figures below include MVNOs operating on the applicable networks.

Cayman Islands
The British overseas territory has ? million subscribers in total, or a 5% penetration rate.

Chile
The country's telecom regulator is Subsecretaría de Telecomunicaciones (Subtel), and, as of June 2022, has 26.29 million subscribers in total, including prepaid and postpaid customers, and a 132.57% penetration rate.

Colombia
The country has 77.8 million subscribers in total. (Second Trimester 2022)

The country's telecom regulator is the CRC (Comisión de Regulación de Comunicaciones).

Costa Rica
The country has 7.1 million subscribers in total; with 4.76 million people there are about 149 mobile lines for every 100 citizens (149%  penetration rate).

Until 2011, Instituto Costarricense de Electricidad had a monopoly on wireless communications. In November 2011, after the market was open as required by DR-CAFTA, Claro and Movistar started service.

The country's telecom regulator is SUTEL (Spanish)

Cuba
The country has over 6 million subscribers in total, or a 45% penetration rate as of December 2019.

Curaçao

Dominica

Dominican Republic
The country has 8.8 million subscribers as of December 2019.

The country's telecom regulator is Indotel.

Ecuador
The country has 113% penetration rate = 17.5m mobile subscribers (February 2014)

The country's telecom regulator is Arcotel.

El Salvador
The country has 8.8 million subscribers in total for a population of 6.1 million, or a 144% penetration rate. (Dec 2015)

The country's telecom regulator is SIGET.

Falkland Islands
The telecom regulator is Falkland Islands Communications Regulator (FICR).

France(Saint-Pierre-et-Miquelon)
The telecom regulator is the Autorité de Régulation des Communications Électroniques, des Postes et de la Distribution de la Presse.

Greenland

Greenland has 0.053 million subscribers in total, or a 93.32% penetration rate. (December 2009)

Grenada

Guadeloupe, Martinique and French Guiana (Guyane)
As of September 2012, the penetration rate was 153% for Guadeloupe (0.449 million inhabitants), 148% for Martinique (0.396 m.inh.) and 127% for French Guiana (0.236 m.inh.).

Guatemala
The country has 19,113,800 subscribers in total, or a 115% penetration rate. (June 2017)

The country's telecom regulator is SIT.

Guyana

The country has a 66.4% penetration rate (2016). The country's telecom regulator is the Guyana Telecommunications Agency.

Haiti

Honduras
The country has 7.45 million subscribers in total, or a 93.5% penetration rate. (2018)

The country's telecom regulator is CONATEL.

Jamaica
The country has 3.5 million subscribers in total, or a 129% penetration rate (September 2015). The country's telecom regulator is the Spectrum Management Authority.

Mexico
The country has 112 million subscribers in total, or a 91.6% penetration rate. (March 2017)

The country's current telecom regulator is IFETEL (IFT).

Montserrat

Nicaragua
The country has 6.8 million subscribers in total, or a 115% penetration rate. (2013)

Panama
The country has 4.96 Million subscribers in total, or 123 active mobile phones per 100 inhabitants according to ASEP. (December 2016)

Paraguay
The country has 7.34 Million subscribers in total, or a 109% penetration rate. The country's telecom regulator is CONATEL. (Nov 2015)

Peru
The country has 37.3 million subscribers in total for a population of 30.4 million, or a 123% penetration rate. (Mar. 2017)

The country's telecom regulator is OSIPTEL.

Puerto Rico and United States Virgin Islands
These U.S. territories have 3 million subscribers in total, or an 84% penetration rate. (June 2012).

The telecom regulator for Puerto Rico and the United States Virgin Islands at federal level is the United States' Federal Communications Commission (FCC).

The local telecom regulator for Puerto Rico is the Junta Reglamentadora de Telecomunicaciones de Puerto Rico (JRTPR) The local telecom regulator for USVI is the USVI Public Services Commission (USVIPSC)

 Currently unable to determine T-Mobile and TracFone subscriber numbers without the United States' subscribers.

Saint Kitts and Nevis
The country has approximately 25,000 subscribers in total.

Saint Lucia

Saint Vincent and the Grenadines

Suriname
The country has 0.81 million subscribers in total, or a 146% penetration rate. (2016). The regulator is the Telecommunicatie Authoriteit Suriname (TAS).

Trinidad and Tobago
At the end of 2021, the country has 2.00 million subscribers in total, or a 146% penetration rate. The regulator is Telecommunications Authority of Trinidad and Tobago (TATT)

Turks and Caicos Islands

United States

Mobile virtual network operators (MVNOs) in the United States lease wireless telephone and data service from major carriers such as AT&T Mobility, T-Mobile US, and Verizon Wireless, as well as regional carrier United States Cellular Corporation for resale. The largest operator of MVNOs is TracFone Wireless with over 25 million subscribers.

The country's telecom regulator is the United States Federal Communications Commission.

 T-Mobile and AT&T US numbers include Puerto Rico and US Virgin Islands subscribers.
 T-Mobile and Sprint uses the GCI network in Alaska.

Uruguay
As of June 2020, Uruguay has 5.3 million mobile subscribers in total, with a penetration rate over ???%. The country's telecom regulator is URSEC.

Venezuela
The country has 20.7 million subscribers in December 2018, a 33% drop versus December 2013.

The country's telecom regulator is CONATEL.

See also
 List of mobile network operators of the Asia Pacific region
 List of mobile network operators of Europe
 List of mobile network operators of the Middle East and Africa
 List of mobile network operators worldwide
 List of telecommunications regulatory bodies
 Mobile Network Codes in ITU region 3xx (North America)
 Mobile Network Codes in ITU region 7xx (South America)

References

External links
 GSM Association (official site)
 Americas list of GSM, iDEN and CDMA operators

Americas-related lists
Americas
Telecommunications in North America
Telecommunications in South America
Telecommunications lists